Daniele Braidot (born 29 May 1991) is an Italian professional mountain bike and cyclo-cross cyclist.

His twin brother Luca is also a professional cyclist.

Major results

MTB

2009
 3rd National Junior XCO Championships
2012
 3rd  UCI World Under-23 XCO Championships
2013
 3rd National Under-23 XCO Championships
2014
 3rd National XCE Championships
2015
 2nd National XCO Championships
2016
 1st  National Championship
2019
 2nd National XCO Championships

Cyclo-cross

2008–2009
 1st  National Junior Championships
 3rd Trofeo Città di Lucca Juniors
 8th UCI Junior World Championships
2010–2011
 2nd National Under-23 Championships
2011–2012
 2nd National Under-23 Championships
2012–2013
 2nd National Under-23 Championships
2014–2015
 3rd National Championships
2016–2017
 3rd Gran Premio Città di Vittorio Veneto
2017–2018
 2nd National Championships
2018–2019
 3rd National Championships
 3rd Ciclocross del Ponte

References

External links

1991 births
Living people
Italian male cyclists
Italian mountain bikers
Cyclo-cross cyclists
People from Gorizia
Cyclists from Friuli Venezia Giulia